The General Government of Warsaw was an administrative civil district created by the German Empire in World War I. It encompassed the north-western half of the former Russian-ruled Congress Poland.

Although the territory initially formed a part of the Ober Ost military command under the authority of general Erich Ludendorff, after the military advances of the Central Powers in the fall offensive of 1915 the territory came under a separate administration in October. It continued to exist even after the later establishment of a rump Kingdom of Poland, a Central Powers puppet state. Its governor-general, Hans Hartwig von Beseler, held his office for the entire duration of the region's existence. The headquarters of the General Government operated in the Royal Castle, Warsaw, while the governor-general's seat was in the Belvedere palace, Warsaw.

To the south of the General Government lay an Austro-Hungarian-controlled counterpart called the Military Government of Lublin.

On 18 October 1916 a joint administration was introduced for both districts of the former Congress Poland, with a German civil-servant, Wolfgang von Kries, appointed as the first chief of the intended administration. On 9 December, Kries founded a Polish central bank, which issued a new currency, the Polish marka (Marka polska). 

During the occupation, German authorities drafted Poles into forced labor to replace German workers drafted into the army.

Governors-General 

Chiefs of Joint Administration:

  (18 October 1915 – 26 November 1917)
  (26 November 1917 – 6 October 1918)

See also

 Ober Ost
 Kingdom of Poland (1917–1918)
 Polish Border Strip
 Eastern Front (WWI)
 General Governorate of Belgium

Sources 
 Pro memoria. Prusak w Polsce, by Józef Rapacki.

References

Poland in World War I
States and territories established in 1915
German Empire in World War I
Politics of World War I
Military occupations of Poland
1915 establishments in Poland
1918 disestablishments in Poland
Former countries